The  is a Bo-Bo wheel arrangement DC electric locomotive type operated by the private railway operator Chichibu Railway in Saitama Prefecture, Japan, primarily on freight services, since 1973.

, all of the original seven locomotives are in operation.

History
The first two locomotives, DeKi 501 and 502, were built in 1973, based on the earlier Class DeKi 300 design. These locomotives were finished in then-standard blue Chichibu Railway livery from new, as opposed to the brown livery initially carried by earlier classes. Locomotives DeKi 503 and 504 were delivered in March 1979 ahead of the opening of the Mikajiru Freight Line in October of the same year. These locomotives had larger cab end windows and sunvisors above the cab windows. The last three locomotives of the class, DeKi 505 to 507 were delivered in 1980. DeKi 507 is unique among the class in being privately owned by Taiheiyo Cement, and its introduction in 1980 allowed the similarly privately owned DeKi 101 to be transferred to Chichibu Railway ownership.

Fleet details

References

Chichibu Railway
Electric locomotives of Japan
Bo-Bo locomotives
Hitachi locomotives
1067 mm gauge locomotives of Japan
1500 V DC locomotives
Railway locomotives introduced in 1973